This article provides details of international football games played by the Zaire national football team from 1971 to 1997, when the Democratic Republic of the Congo was named Zaire.

1970s

1972

1973

1974

1975

1976

1977

1979

1980s

1980

1981

1982

1984

1985

1986

1987

1988

1989

1990s

1990

1991

1992

1993

1994

1995

1996

1997

Notes

References 

Democratic Republic of the Congo national football team matches